James Cullen Bressack (born c. 1992 in Los Angeles, California) is an American film producer, screenwriter and film director. He is the son of Emmy Award-winning writer Gordon Bressack and voice actress Ellen Gerstell.

Career
Bressack's first feature film, My Pure Joy, was released in 2011. His 2012 film Hate Crime, the story of a Jewish family being terrorized in their home by neo-Nazis, was banned in the UK in 2015 by the BBFC due to the "unremitting manner in which [it] focuses on physical and sexual abuse, aggravated by racist invective."

His 2013 film To Jennifer was filmed entirely using an iPhone. His 2014 horror film Pernicious was described as "The Ring meets Hostel".

In 2015 he started the Grit Film Works production company with Zack Ward, the two co-writing the films Bethany (directed by Bressack and starring Ward, Shannen Doherty and Tom Green) and Restoration (directed by Ward).
 
He directed the 2017 thriller Limelight. In late 2017 he was reported to be directing supernatural revenge thriller Together, and in 2018 the psychological thriller Alone.

He is Jewish.

Filmography

Films 
My Pure Joy (2011)
Theatre of the Deranged (2011, segments "Andy's Theatre of Derange", "Speak Easy")
13/13/13 (2013)
Hate Crime (2012) (banned in the United Kingdom in 2015)
To Jennifer (2013)
White Crack Bastard (2014)
Theatre of the Deranged II (2014, segment "Unmimely Demise")
Pernicious (2015)
The Condo (2015)
2 Jennifer (2016, as actor - James)
Limelight (2017)
CarGo (2017)
Bethany (2017)
Beyond the Law (2019)
The Call (2020)
Survive the Game (2021)
The Fortress (2021)
Sally Floss: Digital Detective (2022) 
 Hot Seat (2022)
Darkness of Man (TBA)

Short films 
The Pointless Adventure of Brad and Dylan (2004)
Heroine Junky for Dummies (2005)
Lunar Impossible (2006)
Reflecting Love (2008)
The Moving Chair (2008)
CollEDGE (2008)
The Music-Box Killer (2008)
Unmimely Demise (2011)
Dr. Suess's There's a Wocket in My Pocket (2012)
Family Time (2013)
Unicorn Zombie Apocalypse (2014)

Television 
Oh, We Review! (2010–2012, 19 episodes)
Blood Lake: Attack of the Killer Lampreys (2014, TV movie)

References

External links 

 

American film directors
1990s births
American male screenwriters
American film producers
Living people
Film people from Los Angeles
Jewish American writers
Jewish film people
Horror film directors